4086 Podalirius  is a large Jupiter trojan from the Greek camp, approximately  in diameter. It was discovered on 9 November 1985, by Soviet astronomer Lyudmila Zhuravleva at the Crimean Astrophysical Observatory in Nauchnij, on the Crimean peninsula. The assumed C-type asteroid belongs to the 40 largest Jupiter trojans and has a rotation period of 10.43 hours. It was named after the legendary healer Podalirius from Greek mythology.

Orbit and classification 

Podalirius is a dark Jovian asteroid orbiting in the leading Greek camp at Jupiter's  Lagrangian point, 60° ahead of its orbit in a 1:1 resonance (see Trojans in astronomy). It is also a non-family asteroid in the Jovian background population. It orbits the Sun at a distance of 4.6–5.9 AU once every 12 years and 1 month (4,406 days; semi-major axis of 5.26 AU). Its orbit has an eccentricity of 0.12 and an inclination of 22° with respect to the ecliptic.

Physical characteristics 

Podalirius is an assumed C-type asteroid, the most common spectral type among Jupiter trojans after the D-types.

Rotation period 

In May 1991, a rotational lightcurve of Podalirius was obtained by Stefano Mottola and Maria Gonano–Beurer using the ESO 1-metre telescope at La Silla Observatory in northern Chile. Lightcurve analysis gave a typical rotation period of 10.43 hours with a brightness variation of 0.13 magnitude.

In November 2008, photometric follow-up observations by Robert Stephens at his Goat Mountain Astronomical Research Station  gave a divergent period of 14.51 hours and a low amplitude of 0.08, while in March 2013, Mottola's original result was confirmed by astronomers at the Palomar Transient Factory, California, measuring a period 10.436 hours and a brightness variation of 0.16 magnitude in the R-band.

Diameter and albedo 

According to the surveys carried out by the Japanese Akari satellite, the Infrared Astronomical Satellite IRAS, and the NEOWISE mission of NASA's Wide-field Infrared Survey Explorer, Podalirius measures between 85.49 and 86.89 kilometers in diameter and its surface has an albedo between 0.050 and 0.056. The Collaborative Asteroid Lightcurve Link adopts the results obtained by IRAS, that is, an albedo of 0.0536 and a diameter of 86.89 kilometers based on an absolute magnitude of 9.1.

Naming 

This minor planet was named from Greek mythology after the legendary healer Podalirius, who stopped a pestilence during the Trojan War as mentioned in Homer's Iliad. Podalirius is the son of Asclepius and Epione and brother of Hygieia, Machaon (who was also a physician) and Panacea.

The official naming citation was published by the Minor Planet Center on 4 June 1993.

References

External links 
 Asteroid Lightcurve Database (LCDB), query form (info )
 (4086) Podalirius, Dictionary of Minor Planet Names
 Dictionary of Minor Planet Names, Google books
 Discovery Circumstances: Numbered Minor Planets (1)-(5000) – Minor Planet Center
 
 

004086
Discoveries by Lyudmila Zhuravleva
Named minor planets
19851109